Encore is a 1951 anthology film composed of adaptations of three short stories by W. Somerset Maugham:
 "The Ant and the Grasshopper", directed by Pat Jackson and adapted by T. E. B. Clarke;
 "Winter Cruise" (from the 1947 collection of Maugham stories Creatures of Circumstance), directed by Anthony Pelissier, screenplay by Arthur Macrae;
 "Gigolo and Gigolette" (from the 1940 collection of Maugham stories The Mixture as Before), directed by Harold French, written by Eric Ambler.

Maugham introduces each part of the film with a piece to camera from his garden on the French Riviera. Encore was the final film in a Maugham trilogy, preceded by Quartet and Trio. The film was entered into the 1952 Cannes Film Festival.

Plot summary

"The Ant and the Grasshopper"
Idle Tom Ramsay (Nigel Patrick) continually borrows from his hard-working brother George (Roland Culver). George later puts up the Ramsay estate for sale so he can buy out his business partner, despite Tom's protests. Shortly afterwards, George is approached by car dealer Philip Cronshaw (Peter Graves), who notifies him that Tom has stolen one of his automobiles. To avoid a scandal, George pays for it, but was a fraud; Cronshaw and Tom split George's money.

While squandering his ill-gotten funds, Tom discovers that Gertrude Wilmot (Margaret Vyner), the third richest woman in the world, is staying at the same seaside resort. He becomes acquainted with her, then (aware that she is fed up with lying admirers) frankly admits that he is a scoundrel attracted to her great wealth. Surprisingly, this approach works and they become engaged.

Tom pays George back for all the money he took over the years. When George complains about the injustice of Tom not having to work for his good fortune, Tom mentions that Gertrude is buying the family estate.

"Winter Cruise"
English spinster Molly Reid (Kay Walsh) takes a sea cruise to Jamaica. To the annoyance of the other passengers and the crew, she talks non-stop on the outbound voyage. When the captain (Noel Purcell) learns that she will be returning on the same ship, he decides that something must be done to save the sanity of the crew. The ship's doctor (Ronald Squire) suggests setting her up with a suitor. Pierre (Jacques François), the steward, is ordered to keep Molly occupied. The plan works; the crew's ears are spared, though Molly tells Pierre that she knows he is not in love with her. When disembarking from the ship, Molly tells the captain and crew that she knew all along that the romance had been arranged.

"Gigolo and Gigolette"
In Monte Carlo, Stella (Glynis Johns) and Syd Cotman (Terence Morgan) have a very successful nightclub act. She dives from a great height into a small, shallow tank of flaming water. However, a visit by Flora (Mary Merrall) and Carlo Penezzi (Martin Miller) unnerves her. The older Penezzis used to have a similarly dangerous act: Flora was shot out of a cannon. Stella and Syd argue when she refuses to dive a second time each night, forcing Syd to change their contract with the nightclub manager.

In desperation, Stella takes their life savings, and attempts to win enough at the gambling tables so she can quit, but loses everything. Syd is infuriated when he finds out.

With no choice, she goes on with the act, even though she is terrified that she will eventually be killed. When Flora tells Syd how frightened his wife is, he rushes up the tower to stop her. But she, seeing his concern, dives safely into the tank.

Cast

"The Ant and the Grasshopper"
 Nigel Patrick as Tom Ramsay
 Roland Culver as George Ramsay
 Alison Leggatt as Freda Ramsay
 Peter Graves as Philip Cronshaw
 Margaret Vyner as Gertrude Wilmot
 Michael Trubshawe as Ascot Man

"Winter Cruise"
 Kay Walsh as Miss Molly Reid
 Noel Purcell as Captain Tom
 Ronald Squire as the ship's doctor
 John Laurie as Andrews, the engineer
 Jacques François as Pierre, the steward

"Gigolo and Gigolette"
 Glynis Johns as Stella Cotman
 Terence Morgan as Syd Cotman
 Mary Merrall as Flora Penezzi
 Martin Miller as Carlo Penezzi

Production
Pat Jackson called his segment "lovely fun."

Reception
The film was success at the box-office.

References

External links
 
 

1951 films
British anthology films
1951 comedy-drama films
British comedy-drama films
British black-and-white films
Films based on Aesop's Fables
Films based on short fiction
Films based on works by W. Somerset Maugham
Films directed by Harold French
Films directed by Pat Jackson
Films directed by Anthony Pelissier
Films set in Monaco
Films shot at Pinewood Studios
Films with screenplays by T. E. B. Clarke
Films scored by Richard Addinsell
Films based on multiple works
1950s English-language films
1950s British films